Interstate 165 (I-165) was a proposed auxiliary Interstate Highway in the US state of Indiana. Its planned route would have taken it from the northern split of I-65 and I-70 to 38th Street, entirely within Indianapolis.

History
I-165 was originally planned as a  spur route between I-65 and 38th Street in Indianapolis.

The freeway was added to the Interstate Highway System on June 6, 1978, using mileage available from withdrawals in other states. Acting Administrator Karl S. Bowers of the Federal Highway Administration (FHWA) stated that I-165 could not later be withdrawn under the provisions of 23 U.S.C. 103(e)(2) or 103(e)(4); mileage could only be withdrawn once and to permit redesignated mileage to be withdrawn would incur a second entitlement for substitute funds.

Sections 107(a)(1) and (b) of the Surface Transportation Assistance Act of 1978 prohibited any future Interstate additions or redesignations under 23 U.S.C. 103(e)(2) or 103(e)(4) after November 6, 1978. On August 25, 1980, Administrator John S. Hassell wrote the Indiana State Highway Commission rescinding the condition in Mr. Bowers's 1978 letter. The withdrawal of I-165 as a proposed highway was approved on July 30, 1981, in Administrator R. A. Barnhart's letter to Indiana Governor Robert D. Orr. On April 16, 1981, Governor Robert D. Orr and Mayor William H. Hudnut III submitted a joint request by the state of Indiana and the city of Indianapolis for the withdrawal of I-165 from the Interstate Highway System. Federal Highway Administrator R.A. Barnhart and Urban Mass Transportation Administrator Arthur E. Teele approved the withdrawal under the provisions of 23 U.S.C. 103(e)(4) on July 30, 1981.

See also

References

External links
 I-165 at Kurumi.com
 List of Interstate Highways in Indiana#Interstate 69 (with information on I-165)

65-1
Transportation in Marion County, Indiana
Transportation in Indianapolis
Cancelled highway projects in the United States
1 (Indiana)